Dongcheng (generally ) may refer to the following locations:

Districts
 Dongcheng District, Beijing
 Dongcheng District, Dongguan, Guangdong

Towns
 , subdivision of Yangdong District, Yangjiang, Guangdong
 , subdivision of Yangyuan County, Hebei
 Dongcheng, Wangcheng, a former town of Wangcheng District, Changsha, Hunan, now merged with the town of Chating on 19 November 2015; presently it is a community of Wangcheng.
 , subdivision of Helong, Jilin
 , in Mori Kazakh Autonomous County, Xinjiang
 Dongcheng, Linhai, subdivision of Linhai, Zhejiang

Townships
 , Ji County, Shanxi

Subdistricts

Anhui
 , in Jieshou City

Chongqing
 , in Nanchuan District
 , in Tongliang District

Guangdong
 , in Qingcheng District, Qingyuan
 , in Sihui City

Fujian
 , in Xinluo District, Longyan

Henan
 , in Jia County
 , in Shangshui County
 , in Shenqiu County

Hubei
 , in Jingzhou District, Jingzhou
 , in Lichuan City
 , in Zengdu District, Suizhou

Inner Mongolia
 , in Hongshan District
 , in Erenhot City

Jilin
 , in Longtan District, Jilin City

Liaoning
 , in Gaizhou City
 , in Lingyuan City
 , in Xinmin City

Shaanxi
 , in Xingping City

Shandong
 , in Dongying District, Dongying
 , in Mudan District, Heze
 , in Linqu County
 , in Dongchangfu District, Liaocheng
 , in Shan County

Shanxi
 , in Gaoping City
 , in Yangcheng County
 , in Yanhu District, Yuncheng

Sichuan
 , in Bazhou District, Bazhong
 , in Tongchuan District, Dazhou
 , in Xichang City
 , in Yucheng District, Ya'an
 , in Cuiping District, Yibin

Xinjiang
 , in Kuqa County
 , in Shihezi City

Zhejiang
 , in Huangyan District, Taizhou
 , in Yongjia County
 , in Yongkang City